The following is a list of teams and cyclists that will take part in the 2020 Giro d'Italia.

Teams
The 19 UCI WorldTeams are automatically invited to the race. Additionally, the organisers of the Giro invited three second-tier UCI Professional Continental teams to participate in the event.

The teams participating in the race are:

UCI WorldTeams

 
 
 
 
 
 
 
 
 
 
 
 
 
 
 
 
 
 
 

UCI Professional Continental teams

Cyclists

By starting number

By team

By nationality

References

2020 Giro d'Italia
2020